Radio Amber is a Bangladeshi FM radio station, headquartered in Dhaka. It started regular broadcasts on 1 September 2016.

References

External links
 http://www.radioamber.com/#/home

2016 establishments in Bangladesh
Organisations based in Dhaka
Radio stations in Bangladesh
Mass media in Dhaka